Letitia Fitzpatrick (born 23 January 1962, Belfast) is a journalist.

Fitzpatrick has worked for as a journalist for the Irish News, BBC NI, UTV and ACM.

Career
Fitzpatrick was a reporter for the Irish News in Belfast from 1983 to 1988. She worked as a journalist for BBC Northern Ireland from 1988 to 1997. She then joined UTV and worked there for 12 years, as a senior TV journalist and presenter.

She did voluntary work for the Northern Ireland Cancer Network.

Between 2009 and 2015, Fitzpatrick worked for Citybeat radio and for the BBC as a freelance journalist on Panorama, Spotlight, The One Show and Children in Need.

She worked as a senior journalist for ACM.

In 2018, Fitzpatrick was awarded the Paul Harris Fellowship from Wauchope Rotary.

Personal life
Fitzpatrick has two adult children from her first marriage. Her second husband died in 2007.

References

1962 births
Living people
Television presenters from Northern Ireland
Journalists from Northern Ireland
UTV (TV channel)
People with bipolar disorder